Trude Lehmann (1892–1987) was a German film actress.

Selected filmography
 Children of No Importance (1926)
 We'll Meet Again in the Heimat (1926)
 Unmarried Daughters (1926)
 Nanette Makes Everything (1926)
 The False Prince (1927)
 Miss Chauffeur (1928)
 The House Without Men (1928)
 Adam and Eve (1928)
 What a Woman Dreams of in Springtime (1929)
 Youth of the Big City (1929)
 Painted Youth (1929)
 The Lord of the Tax Office (1929)
 Dolly Gets Ahead (1930)
 That's All That Matters (1931)
 Shadows Over St. Pauli (1938)
 Shoulder Arms (1939)
 The Girl at the Reception (1940)

References

Bibliography
 Grange, William. Cultural Chronicle of the Weimar Republic. Scarecrow Press, 2008.

External links

1892 births
1987 deaths
German film actresses
German silent film actresses
Actors from Magdeburg
20th-century German actresses